Terme (formerly spelled Termeh; Ancient Greek: Thèrmae, Θέρμαι) is the seat of Terme District, Samsun Province, Turkey. Terme is located on Terme River, about 5 km from its mouth, on the eastern end of the Çarşamba Plain.

Terme or its environs are the site of the ancient city of Themiscyra, Θεμίσκυρα.

Terme District is the site of an annual festival celebrating the Amazons, an ancient nation of all-female warriors who, according to Greek myth, were believed to have lived in the Samsun region.

See also 
 Themiscyra Plain

References

Populated places in Samsun Province
Fishing communities in Turkey
Districts of Samsun Province